Wesley Ngo Baheng (born 23 September 1989) is a French footballer of Cameroonian descent who plays for UJA Alfortville.

Biography
Baheng began playing at the youth system of Le Havre, and was offered a contract with Newcastle United in January 2008. He accepted but spent 18 months out of football due to a cruciate ligament injury. After a deal with 1. FC Nürnberg fell through, in the early weeks of the 2010–11 season, Baheng had trials at Amiens, Faro, Mechelen and Gateshead, but eventually signed for Aldershot Town on a short-term deal. He made his professional debut as a substitute in the 2–0 defeat in the FA Cup match against Dover Athletic on 27 November 2010. Ngo Baheng was released by new Aldershot manager, Dean Holdsworth at the end of his short-term contract on 19 January 2011. On 28 January 2011, he signed a week-to-week contract with Hereford United, he left the club in March 2011. After a difficult season in Blanc-Mesnil, and coming back from injury, in June 2012, Wesley Ngo Baheng signed a contract federal to FC Dieppe.

Music
Ngo Baheng has also experimented with rap, recording several tracks under the alias F-ikass which is a diminutive of the French word efficace which directly translates to effective in English. In 2010, he produced a music video with local Newcastle R&B singer Kallum Campbell – titled "Tiddies on a Sunday". He has a publishing company and events company with his manager Sasha Huet Baranov.

He also featured on Kallum Campbells debut album ‘Burberry Slippers’, appearing on the track ‘packet dropper’.

Club stats
As of 15 April 2011.

References

External links

1989 births
Living people
French footballers
French sportspeople of Cameroonian descent
Le Havre AC players
Association football forwards
Newcastle United F.C. players
Aldershot Town F.C. players
Hereford United F.C. players
English Football League players
FC Dieppe players
UJA Maccabi Paris Métropole players
People from Le Blanc-Mesnil
Footballers from Seine-Saint-Denis
Expatriate footballers in England
French expatriate sportspeople in England
French expatriate footballers